Nikos Gyftokostas (born 1 July 1992) is a Greek professional footballer who plays as a winger.

References

1992 births
Living people
Greek footballers
Gamma Ethniki players
Football League (Greece) players
Super League Greece 2 players
PAE Kerkyra players
A.E. Karaiskakis F.C. players
Association football wingers
Footballers from Arta, Greece